Ardrahan GAA is a Gaelic Athletic Association club that is located in Ardrahan, County Galway, Ireland. The club was founded in 1884 and is almost exclusively concerned with the game of hurling.

Honours

 Connacht Senior Club Hurling Championship (3): 1974, 1975, 1978 
 Galway Senior Hurling Championship (11): 1894, 1895, 1896, 1901, 1902, 1903, 1910, 1949, 1974, 1975, 1978 
 Galway Junior Hurling Championship (2): 1934, 1979 
 Galway Intermediate Hurling Championship (3): 1947, 1949, 1965. 
 Galway Under-21 Hurling Championship (1): 1977
 Galway Under-21 B Hurling Championship (1): 2001
 Galway Minor Hurling Championship (2): 1975, 1978

Notable players
 Bernie Forde
 Iarla Tannian
 Jonathan Glynn

External links
Ardrahan GAA site

Gaelic games clubs in County Galway
Hurling clubs in County Galway
1884 establishments in Ireland